The Mark of Conte is a children's book written by American author Sonia Levitin.

It concerns a teenager who creates two identities in his high school computer in order to garner his required credits in a shorter time.  Although the main plot line is fictional, the character Conte Mark (aka Mark Conte) is based on Sonia Levitin's son Daniel Levitin, and some incidents are based on his actual experiences as a student at Palos Verdes High School, in Los Angeles County, in the 1970s.

References 
(2001). "USM de Grummond Collection - Sonia Levitin Papers". Retrieved Jul 8, 2005.
(1982). "California Young Readers Medal". Retrieved September 14, 2006

1976 American novels
American children's novels
Novels set in high schools and secondary schools
1976 children's books
Atheneum Books books
Works by Sonia Levitin